James Peake was a footballer who played inside-left for Burslem Port Vale and Millwall Athletic.

Career
Peake signed for Midland Football League side Burslem Port Vale from Crewe Alexandra in January 1887. The club were re-elected to the Football League in summer 1898, and Peake was top scorer for the 1898–99 season with 17 strikes, 11 of which came in the Second Division. He scored against Barnsley, Small Heath, and Manchester City; scored twice in games against Loughborough and Blackpool, and also scored four goals past Blackpool at the Athletic Ground on 21 January 1899. He also hit three goals in the qualifying stages of the FA Cup, hitting two past Wellington Town and one past Burton Wanderers.

In May 1899, he left for Millwall Athletic, then a Southern League club. After helping the club to a seventh-place finish in 1899–1900, he returned to Burslem Port Vale in summer 1900. He bagged seven goals in 31 league and cup games in 1900–01, finding the net against Burnley, Gainsborough Trinity, Burton Swifts, Stockport County, Chesterfield (twice), and New Brighton Tower. He departed the club again, never to return to the Football League. He made a total of 98 appearances (50 in the Football League) and scored 30 goals (18 in the Football League) for Burslem Port Vale within two spells.

Career statistics
Source:

References

Year of birth missing
Year of death missing
English footballers
Association football forwards
Crewe Alexandra F.C. players
Port Vale F.C. players
Millwall F.C. players
Midland Football League players
English Football League players
Southern Football League players